Shahida Waheed is a Pakistani politician who is the member of the Provincial Assembly of Khyber Pakhtunkhwa.

Political career
Shahida was elected to the Provincial Assembly of Khyber Pakhtunkhwa as a candidate of Awami National Party (ANP) on a reserved seat for women in consequence of 2018 Pakistani general election. She assumed the membership of the assembly on 13 August 2018.

References

Living people
Awami National Party politicians
Politicians from Khyber Pakhtunkhwa
Year of birth missing (living people)